This is a list of alleged sightings of unidentified flying objects or UFOs in South Africa.

1914 phantom monoplanes
From 11 August to 9 September 1914, thousands of South Africans in various parts of the country observed what they believed to be a nighttime monoplane, or believed to observe its headlights, while in some cases the aerial vehicle performed sophisticated maneuvers. This was in the weeks leading up to the South West Africa campaign during the First World War, and many suspected a hostile German monoplane on a possible spy or bombing mission. However, these possibilities were discounted and the provenance of the plane remained unknown. Likewise its destination, landing or refueling places and the identity of its pilot remained unknown, causing some to examine it as a case of mass hysteria.

1960s sightings
 In January 1960, mr. D. Coetzee, manager for a large insurance firm in Port Elizabeth, noticed a noiseless, silvery cigar-shaped craft while travelling home at 17:40. It had no visible means of propulsion but was slowly moving eastwards at an estimated  altitude, when it suddenly accelerated and disappeared in seconds.

1970s sighting
 Bennie Smit, owner of Braeside farm near Fort Beaufort in the Eastern Cape, claimed to have fired shots at an unknown object during the morning of 26 June 1971. Smit accurately fired eight shots at it, but these had no visible effect. Instead the object reacted to their presence and voices by shying away and hiding. Police sergeant Piet Kitching and police station commander P.R. van Rensburg arrived at 10:00 and fired additional shots. They stated that the object had been changing its colour up to this point, but now assumed the appearance of a gunmetal grey, somewhat oval-shaped 44-gallon drum. When Smit fired two final shots from a mere 10 to 18 m distance, the object lifted off, entering impenetrable woods where it could be heard crashing through the undergrowth. Smit had a final sighting after 12 noon, but subsequently heard its sound at night. Six council members at Fort Beaufort also reported watching the object though binoculars. Nine imprints (three sets of three) of its supposed landing gear were found in hard clay.  Though the Grahamstown army regiment was said to have investigated the site, the base could later not produce any records of the event. The incident received coverage by international press, and led to businesses capitalizing on the incident, with a tavern calling itself the "UFO Bar" and painting flying saucers on the walls and the local Savoy Hotel keeping clippings of the stories posted on its walls. In a humorous editorial, the New Scientist stated the apartheid South African government was "very fastidious about the sort of immigrants she welcomes and little green men may very well be on the prohibited list".

1990s sightings
 On 7 April 1991, at 11:15 pm a hovering triangular craft with red central light, and white star-like lights on each extremity, was observed by a family at Baviaanspoort, Pretoria. A similar craft was sighted in the nearby Eersterust township on the evenings of 8 and 9 April, either stationary or moving. These sightings occurred about a year after the Belgian UFO flap concluded. A decade later another hovering triangular craft was reported by a family travelling in the Hartbeespoort area, about 50 km to the west.
 On 18 November 1993, at 10:15 pm, Messrs du Plessis and Venter, residents of Sasolburg, observed a craft arriving from the direction of Vereeniging. The craft departed in a flash in the direction of Parys, but returned some three minutes later. The craft, similar in appearance to a water droplet, was observed to change colour and shape. With time individual lights were distinguished, and the body was determined to be cigar-shaped. While contained in a yellowish to orange glow, it emitted a downward blue light, before once again departing in a flash, upwards. A nearby town resident claimed to have found imprints of a small craft's landing gear, some two months later.
 In September and October 1994 a farmer at Warrenton claimed to have made repeated observations of a noisy, nighttime craft travelling at great speeds, besides what he described as a 'mothership'. The craft's noise was compared to the sound of a helicopter or Volkswagen Beetle engine. The farmer's general claims were supported by four independent observers.

 A UFO flap swept South Africa from late March to mid April 1995, which was widely reported in the media. At De Brug a hovering object was videoed by a mrs Erasmus, and the police notified at 02:20, who could confirm its presence upon arrival. Around 08:30 that morning a farmer, Jan Pienaar, reportedly encountered a landed craft that blocked his way for three minutes on a rural road south of Coligny.Physical effects were reported; at Coligny, the small truck's engine cut out and the observer felt as if pinned to the ground, while the landing site was left scorching hot to the touch. At Lindley the observers reported that their digital watches stopped as the object passed by. 
 At 4:00 am on 28 August 1996 a glowing disc was videoed by on duty Sgt Nico Stander of the Adriaan Vlok police station, Pretoria, and Pretoria resident Johann Becker noticed it hovering over Erasmuskloof. The pulsating disc contained a red triangle, and at one point emitted bright green tentacles. A chase ensued involving some 200 policemen and a Bo-105 police chopper, piloted by Supt Fred Viljoen. The chopper with five officers took to the air at 5:30 am and spotted the object over Mamelodi. Viljoen was in contact with radar operators at AFB Waterkloof, who reported radar clutter in its vicinity. While pursued by the chopper, it performed vertical and horizontal undulating movements, while outpacing the chopper at maximum speed (some 270 km/h). An object was sighted in the area again during the early hours of 31 August and 1 September. cf. Petrozavodsk phenomenon 
 Around the end of July 1997 a hovering, cylindrical light or shiny cloud, was filmed by Andreas Mathios in the sky above the town of Trichardt, in the current western Mpumalanga province. Besides Mathios, it was independently observed by three other persons around 6:50 am. The light suddenly dropped and rose again before disappearing. Sasol 2 and 3 allegedly had a temporary power outage that morning. Andreas Mathios phoned air traffic control to get information about any objects detected in the airspace. Trichardt was also the scene of a 1985 sighting.
 On 8 May 2000, at 3:24 am, police inspector Kriel claimed to have observed an approaching UFO while travelling on the N3 freeway, 70 km north of Warden in the eastern Free State province. The orange, oval-shaped light was fitted with two cupolas, one above and another below, and was wide enough to cover four lanes of the freeway. After a close approach the craft receded again. A follow up report claimed that the vicinity is known for moving light apparitions.

21st century
 On 27 June 2004, Roshnie Naidu observed and video-taped a very bright, colourful light that was suspended near her home in Durban for three hours. She was able to alert family members and neighbours to its presence, and observed it changing shape from circular to oval.
The first formation of seven objects were seen at 21:51 on 27 February, as they flew westwards from Middelburg towards Witbank. Due to their altitude they eventually disappeared behind clouds. At 20:00 on 6 March, they were noted again high in the sky, but this time greater in number, 23, and traveling in the opposite direction.
 On the evenings of 21 and 22 July 2010, residents of Booysens, Pretoria, observed a triangle of bright lights which hung motionless in the sky for two hours. In each instance the object commenced a slow descent towards the horizon at 20:30. Binocular observation revealed nothing more than a blue and emerald light, with a white light which shone straight downwards.
 On the evenings of 11, 20 and 21 May 2011, a host of silent, orange lights with consistent luminosity were observed as they travelled faster than a commercial aeroplane over Tierpoort near Pretoria (some 20 objects) and Krugersdorp respectively. On 15 June seven of these objects were observed and some photographed as they crossed the sky in single file over Tierpoort. At 22:00 on 30 October 2011, a Mr van Greuning photographed two of the five silent fireballs which he observed traveling southwards in low cloud near the town of Harrismith.
 Two Prestbury residents noticed an orange orb in the sky over Pietermaritzburg in November 2015, and obtained a blurry photograph. Shortly afterwards, on 22 November 2015, Ian Carbutt managed to take another cellphone photo of the last of four orange orbs travelling swiftly in single file over Roberts road, Clarendon, in the direction of Greytown. Six days later, on the evening 28 November, social media was abuzz with various reports of what seemed to be a green light hanging in the sky over Long Street, Cape Town.
 Around 21:30 on 12 December 2016, while on an eastward course some 10 nautical miles offshore from Jeffreys Bay, the captain and co-pilot of a Boeing 737 cargo aircraft saw an unidentified glowing green object rise past their cockpit. A green parachute flare was suspected, but then ruled out due to the altitude reached. Officials at Port Elizabeth Airport suspected that a stricken vessel or aircraft might be involved, but the NSRI found that none were overdue or missing.

Crash claims and hoaxes

1989 Kalahari crash
According to supposed leaked documents an alien craft was shot down by South African aircraft, some  into Botswana, on 7 May 1989. Two alien beings were claimed to have been captured on site. To date no primary witnesses have been traced, while the supporting documents, some obvious fakes, were all obtained from James van Greunen. Researcher Tony Dodd lent Van Greunen some credibility in Quest magazine, but other researchers were highly skeptical.

1995 Lesotho crash
According to supposed leaked documents an alien craft crashed in Lesotho on 15 September. It was claimed that South African forces retrieved the craft and took three alien beings captive. The source of these documents is unknown, but is once again suspected to be James van Greunen. Failing to trace any key individuals or witnesses, researcher Michael Hesemann denounced it as 'a complete hoax'. Other researchers, though skeptical, held out hope to trace witnesses.

See also
 List of reported UFO sightings

Notes

External links
 Scans of Cynthia Hind's UFO Afrinews
 UfoRSA, UFO research of South Africa

South Africa
Historical events in South Africa
South African folklore